Illyricum sacrum is a multi-volume historical work written in Latin dealing with history of the Catholic Church in the Balkans. The work was published in eight volumes in the period 1751-1819, with the ninth tome printed in the period 1902-1919 as an appendix to Frane Bulić's Bulletino di archeologia e storia dalmata.

The first five volumes (issued 1751-1775) were authored by Daniele Farlati; the volumes 6 (1800) and 7 (1817), were coauthored by Jacopo Coleti, who also published the last volume in 1819.

References

External links
 Volume I - Ecclesia Salonitana, ab ejus exordio usque ad saeculum quastum aerae Christianae (1751)
 Volume II - Ecclesia Salonitana, a quarto saeculo aerae Christianae usque ad excidium Salonae (1753)
 Volume III - Ecclesia Spalatensis olim Salonitana (1765)
 Volume IV - Ecclesiae suffraganeae metropolis Spalatensis (1769)
 Volume V - Ecclesia Jadertina cum suffraganeis, et ecclesia Zagabriensis (1775)
 Volume VI - Ecclesia Ragusina cum suffraganeis, et ecclesia Rhiziniensis et Catharensis (1800)
 Volume VII - Ecclesia Diocletana, Antibarensis, Dyrrhachiensis, et Sirmiensis cum earum suffraganeis (1817)
 Volume VIII - Ecclesiae Scopiensis, Sardicensis, Marcianopolitana, Achridensis et Ternobensis cum earum suffraganeis (1819)
 Accessiones et correctiones all'Illyricum sacrum del P. D. Farlati (1909)

History of Catholicism in Europe
History books about the Balkans